A Song For Edmond Shakespeare was the second of the three radio plays by Gary Bleasdale for BBC Radio 4, on the life of Edmund Shakespeare, William's younger brother. It was first broadcast on 7 January 2005 and shortlisted to be nominated for a Sony Radio Award in 2006. The cast of the original production were

Original cast
Edmond Shakespeare - Paul Rhys
Anne - Helen Longworth
Ben - Stuart McLoughlin
Christopher - Stephen Hogan
Alice - Cherry Morris
Crooke - Nigel Barrett
Thomas - Robert Hastie
Rosetta - Emily Wachter
Gatekeeper - Hugh Dickson

External links
http://entertainment.timesonline.co.uk/tol/arts_and_entertainment/tv_and_radio/article406399.ece
http://www.radiolistings.co.uk/programmes/s/so/song_for_edmond_shakespeare__a.html

William Shakespeare
British radio dramas
2005 audio plays